The Western Way is a Western music trade magazine.

It is published quarterly in Coppell, Texas, by the Western Music Association.

History and profile
The Western Way  features articles about current Western music, musicians, musical groups, and cowboy poetry, as well as historical articles.  It also covers professional training and self-help subjects. In addition, each issue contains listings of Western music festivals, playlists of Western music currently played by radio stations, and reviews of trade related CDs and books.

In the 2010s Don Cusic was the editor of the magazine.

References

External links
 Western Music Association

Poetry magazines published in the United States
Music magazines published in the United States
Quarterly magazines published in the United States
Culture of the Western United States
Magazines with year of establishment missing
Magazines published in Texas
Professional and trade magazines